Cassandra Cain (also known as Cassandra Wayne and Cassandra Wu-San) is a superheroine appearing in American comic books published by DC Comics, commonly in association with the superhero Batman. Created by Kelley Puckett and Damion Scott, Cassandra Cain first appeared in Batman #567 (July 1999). The character is one of several who have assumed the role of Batgirl. Over the years, she has also assumed the code names of Black Bat and Orphan.

Cassandra's origin story presents her as the daughter of assassins David Cain and Lady Shiva. She was deprived of speech and human contact during her childhood as conditioning to become the world's greatest assassin. Consequently, Cassandra grew up to become an expert martial artist and developed an incredible ability to interpret body language to the point of reading complex thoughts, while simultaneously developing limited social skills and remaining mute and  illiterate.

Cassandra was the first Batgirl to star in her own ongoing Batgirl comic book series. She was replaced as Batgirl by Stephanie Brown in a 2009 storyline. She returned in late 2010, where she was shown working as an anonymous agent of Batman in Hong Kong before adopting the new moniker of Black Bat. The character was brought back to mainstream continuity after the company-wide reboot in Batman & Robin Eternal, using the code name Orphan, previously used by her father, David Cain. The character's full history was restored in DC's 2021 Infinite Frontier relaunch.

The character made her cinematic debut in the DC Extended Universe film Birds of Prey, portrayed by Ella Jay Basco.

Publication history
Cassandra Cain first appeared in Batman #567 (July 1999), written by Kelley Puckett and penciled by Damion Scott (who are generally credited with her invention).

In 2000, Cassandra became the first Batgirl to be featured in an eponymous ongoing comic book series.

During the "War Games" story arc in 2004, Batman relies heavily on Cassandra to help control the violence of the gang war in Gotham City.

Cassandra took on the role of a villain by becoming the head of the League of Assassins following the "One Year Later" continuity jump, as established in Robin #150 (July 2006).

Cassandra then appears in Supergirl #14 (April 2007), battling the title character, (Kara Zor-El).

In Teen Titans vol. 3 #44 (April 2007), it was revealed that Cassandra battled Supergirl first, before attacking the Teen Titans with the Titans East.

Cassandra reappears later in the Robin series.

Cassandra next appears on the roster of Titans East once again wearing the Batgirl costume. Cassandra remained in the role of a villain, under the command of Titans East's leader, Deathstroke.

In October 2007, DC announced that Cassandra would be taking up the Batgirl identity as a member of the Outsiders in the upcoming Batman and the Outsiders ongoing series to be written by Chuck Dixon, which appears to, or is hoped to, begin resolving the controversy.

In February 2008, Dan DiDio revealed during a convention panel that writer Adam Beechen would be writing a "new Batgirl" miniseries. Beechen himself said that the story would resolve the questions over Cassandra's behavior and will be a setup for new Batgirl adventures.

In 2009, Cassandra passes the Batgirl identity to Stephanie Brown.

In July 2010, Cassandra appeared as one of the main characters in a short story written and drawn by Amanda Conner for Wonder Woman #600, where she helps Wonder Woman and Power Girl in a battle against Egg Fu.

After Bruce Wayne returns, it is revealed that Cassandra's disillusionment was a ruse, and that she had willingly handed over her Batgirl mantle to Stephanie because she was acting under her mentor's orders, and she is now working as a codename-less vigilante.

In 2011, in Grant Morrison's Batman Inc. series, it is revealed that Cassandra had taken up the name Black Bat.

At C2E2 2011, it was confirmed that Cassandra would be appearing as a main character in Scott Snyder and Kyle Higgins' mini-series Batman: Gates of Gotham.

After the New 52, Cassandra appeared in what appeared to be a variant timeline; however, at San Diego Comic-Con International 2015, James Tynion IV announced that Cassandra would be introduced into mainstream continuity in Batman & Robin Eternal.

February 4, 2020 was the debut of Cassandra Cain's first graphic novel, Shadow of the Batgirl, written by Sarah Kuhn and illustrated by Nicole Goux.

Fictional character biography

Early History

Cassandra's birth and childhood are revealed in the Batgirl series. David Cain had sought a perfect bodyguard for Ra's al Ghul. He found a potential mother when he saw Sandra Wu-San fighting her sister Carolyn in a martial arts tournament. Believing that Sandra was holding back for Carolyn, Cain murdered Carolyn and lured Sandra into a trap, sparing her life in exchange for giving birth to his child and leaving that child for him to raise. She agreed. After the birth of Cassandra, Sandra set out to become Lady Shiva.

Cain trained Cassandra from birth to be an assassin. She was not taught to read or write; instead, reading body language was her only language. She was able to read people's movements and predict what they were going to do. When she was eight, Cain took her to kill a businessman. As the man died, she read what he was feeling, realized what she had done, and ran away from her father.

After that, her activities are, so far, a mystery, until she first appears during the "No Man's Land" story arc.

No Man's Land

During the "No Man's Land" storyline, after Gotham was leveled by an earthquake and isolated, Cassandra Cain saves Commissioner Gordon's life and gains Bruce Wayne's approval, and, eventually, becomes the new Batgirl.

Her father, David Cain, sends a video of Cassandra's first murder to Bruce Wayne (Batman) attempting to disrupt her status.  However, Wayne continues to accept Cassandra after she takes several bullets to save the life of a hired assassin, proving her devotion to protecting human life.

Batgirl

Bruce Wayne sends Cassandra to Barbara Gordon, currently functioning as Oracle. Barbara says she prefers to live alone but since Cassandra is never home and doesn't talk, it is just like living alone. A telepath "rewires" Cassandra's brain so that she can think with words and use language, but these abilities come at some cost to her ability to read people's body language. As she had relied completely on this ability to fight, she is unable to effectively fight crime. Worried, Bruce Wayne takes away her costume and begins training her in defensive skills.

Cassandra soon discovers that the assassin Lady Shiva can read people like she used to be able to and asks Shiva to reteach her. Lady Shiva accepts on the condition that they would have a duel to the death a year later. As Cassandra would rather be "perfect for a year" instead of "mediocre for a lifetime", she accepts the offer. When the women fight in a year's time, Cassandra dies within minutes. Shiva then restarts her heart, realizing Cassandra had a death wish, so that they can have a real fight. In the subsequent fight, Cassandra beats Shiva but does not kill her.

Though not known for her private life, Cassandra does have a one-time romance with Conner Kent after meeting him on a cruise ship. He shares her first kiss, and she even visits him at his home in Smallville, though the relationship never becomes serious.

Cassandra then helps Batman control the violence of a gang war in Gotham City.

Later, Batgirl moves to Blüdhaven with Tim Drake (the third Robin) at Batman's suggestion and with his financial support. There, Deathstroke takes on a contract from the Penguin to kill Batgirl and decides to let his daughter, Rose (the current Ravager), do the job instead. Cassandra beats Rose by playing on her emotions to leave her open for a critical strike, giving Deathstroke no choice but to get her medical attention.

During this time, Cassandra starts developing a friendship with Brenda, the woman who owns the local coffee shop, and even a very short-lived relationship with a boy named Zero. Unfortunately, her friends are all killed in the Blüdhaven disaster.

Cassandra also goes undercover for Batman, as Kasumi, in the Justice League Elite, working under Sister Superior to track and eliminate metahuman threats to the population. She works with the Batman's old fellow Justice League members Green Arrow and the Flash, and forms a bond with Coldcast, who is the first Leaguer to whom she reveals her identity. Although he is subsequently accused of murder, she and the rest of the team soon realize that he has been manipulated by renegade Elite member Menagerie, who was himself being manipulated by the spirit of Manchester Black as he tried to drive his sister to destroy London. As the JLA falls, the Elite, united by the spirit of the deceased Manitou Raven, free Vera and vanquish Black, although the team disbands after this last mission.

Cassandra gathers evidence that indicates that Shiva could be her mother, and seeks her out to confirm this, rejoining the League of Assassins. After she is proclaimed by Nyssa al Ghul as the "One Who Is All", the students of the League are split, half following Shiva, and the others Cassandra. In the following confrontation, Cassandra is mortally wounded by her "adoptive brother", the Mad Dog, while heroically saving one of the students under her leadership. Shiva revives Cassandra in a Lazarus Pit, then answers Cassandra's questions about her parentage. When Cassandra asked Shiva whether she was still killing, whether she would ever stop, Shiva says she was, and responds, "It's why I had you", so Cassandra agrees to fight her to the death once more.

After a closely matched battle, Cassandra manages to break Shiva's neck, paralyzing her. She appears ready to place Shiva in the Lazarus Pit, but Shiva pleads with her not to do so. Instead, Cassandra impales Shiva on a hook hanging over the pit, apparently killing her. Cassandra then abandons the identity of Batgirl and returns to her life as a wanderer.

One Year Later

Robin (Tim Drake) captures David Cain and brings him to the League of Assassins as ransom to free Cassandra, only to find that Cassandra is the new leader. Cassandra produces a gun and tells him to shoot Cain and join her league. Upon his refusal, she shoots Cain herself. Tim and Cassandra engage in a fight which ends when the platform they are fighting on explodes. By the time Tim comes back to the original location, Cassandra and Cain are gone and the ninjas' necks have been snapped. Tim had secretly recorded the conversation, clearing his name, but branding Cassandra as a murderer at the same time.

Brief Appearances

Cassandra next surfaces when she is hired by Dark Angel to kill Supergirl and attempts to do so by kidnapping Supergirl's friend, Captain Boomerang. Supergirl arrives at the League's Tibetan headquarters to confront Cassandra, where they fight. Cassandra uses swords that emit red sun energy which strips away Supergirl's powers. However, as Cassandra prepares to kill her, Supergirl mysteriously extrudes crystals from her body which injure Cassandra.

Later, Cassandra approaches Dodge, a wannabe superhero with teleportation powers, wanting him to steal a drug that gives humans metahuman strength in exchange for money. Cassandra (with an ally) plans to use the drug to create an army. She also makes another appearance where she murders the businessman who was producing that drug, who Robin has previously unsuccessfully attempted to bring to justice.

Teen Titans

Cassandra is left behind while Batman, Robin, and Nightwing leave for their year-long trip and Harvey Dent is charged with protecting Gotham instead of her. Deathstroke approaches Cassandra and preys on her desire for a loving father as well as her feelings of abandonment.  Apparently, Deathstroke manages to inject Cassandra with drugs, from a distance, that warped her mind allowing for him to manipulate her to his liking.

Having gained control of his daughter, Deathstroke recruits her into Titans East, where she resumes the role and costume of Batgirl.

As a member of Titans East, she has a rematch with the Ravager and a brief confrontation with Robin, after which Robin injects Cassandra with a counter-serum (prepared in case Deathstroke regains control of his daughter), and she is apparently freed from Deathstroke's control and vows to kill Deathstroke to revenge herself.

However, some time later, when she is working with the Teen Titans, Miss Martian comments that she is more in control of herself now.  She faces Deathstroke, Match, and other former Titans East teammates, before being subdued by Risk. Soon after, Cyborg, Raven, and Duela Dent summon former Titans Nightwing, Donna Troy, Beast Boy, and the Flash (Bart Allen), who join them against Deathstroke's team. Batgirl attempts to kill Deathstroke, but is stopped and knocked unconscious by Nightwing, who demands that Deathstroke face the courts. However, Deathstroke escapes from the Titans with the help of Inertia, and after the battle is over, Batgirl and Duela Dent both vanish without a word.

Batman and the Outsiders

Cassandra retakes the Batgirl mantle to join the Outsiders at Batman's request. She moves into the team's apartment, but does not show much desire to socialize with her teammates. Batman also offers membership to Green Arrow, who is furious to learn that the former leader of the League of Assassins is on the team as well. While on a mission, Green Arrow and Batgirl battle one another and end up gaining an unusual sort of respect for each other. The team as a whole begins to slowly accept Batgirl into their ranks after she frees all of them from the Chinese military.

After the loss of their leader in the 2008 "Batman R.I.P." storyline, the Outsiders are left in disarray. Cassandra, believing that Batman brought her onto the team for just such a contingency, takes command of the group. Together, they undertake a search for the Batman.

Batgirl (2008)

After Batman is found, Cassandra moves into Wayne Manor, on the trail of father and Deathstroke. She uses the Batcave's computer to locate them but is attacked by Nightwing, who claims she cannot be trusted. Robin and Batman give her the benefit of the doubt.

Due to her research, Cassandra learns that David Cain and Deathstroke started up a school training Cassandra's "sisters". When Cassandra hears that the school's purpose was to "cripple the meta-hero community", she believes Oracle is about to be assassinated and rushes to her base of operations. She locates her father on a rooftop and engages in a one-on-one fight, eventually sending him over a ledge. When he loses his grip, she tries to save him but fails; he falls to another part of the rooftop. Batman, who had followed her, accepts her into the family again and says he will adopt her and make her his daughter.

However, after Bruce Wayne's apparent death, Cassandra, apparently disillusioned, passes the cowl to her close friend, Stephanie Brown, then she leaves Gotham.

Black Bat

After Bruce Wayne returns, it is revealed that Cassandra's disillusionment was a ruse, and that she has willingly handed over her Batgirl mantle to Stephanie because she was acting under her mentor's orders in the event of his death or disappearance, and gone undercover, using Tim Drake as a regular contact. Following Bruce Wayne's public announcement about his intention to create a global team of Batmen, Tim visits Cassandra in Hong Kong, where she has been acting as an codename-less vigilante. He attempts to persuade Cassandra to return to Gotham now that things have returned to normal, but she refuses, saying that Stephanie needs the Batgirl role more than she does. Just before departing, Tim gives Cassandra a copy of her old costume and tells her that if she chooses to stay and fight crime in Hong Kong, he hopes she will do it while wearing a Bat-symbol.

Cassandra takes Tim up on his offer, and joined up with Bruce's new group, now wearing a heavily modified costume that uses her original outfit as a base. She now uses the name of Black Bat, and among other activities brings down a heroin-smuggling operation in Hong Kong.

After a new supervillain named the Architect destroys three Gotham bridges with the help of explosives smuggled from Hong Kong, resulting in the deaths of dozens of civilians. Cassandra, feeling guilty over her failure to stop the explosives from leaving China, returns to Gotham and partners with Red Robin, Dick Grayson, and Damian Wayne (the newest Robin) to bring the Architect to justice. During a stakeout at Oswald Cobblepot's nightclub, Cassandra is mocked and berated by Damian, who tells her that he is a better hero and that Bruce likely sent her to Hong Kong as a demotion. Despite Damian's hostility toward her, Cassandra ultimately saves his life after pulling him out of the club mere seconds before it is destroyed by a bomb. And after Dick discovers that the Architect plans to flood Gotham and kill thousands of civilians, Cassandra and Damian work together to dispose of the explosives that were supposed to sink the city. Once the Architect is defeated and captured, Cassandra decides to stay in Gotham rather than return to Hong Kong.

Cassandra later infiltrates a tournament for hired killers and rescues Red Robin, who had been captured and was about to be sexually assaulted by the half-sister of Ra's al Ghul. After rescuing Tim, Cassandra apparently kills him with a katana, thus winning the tournament for herself. But in fact, she has merely faked Red Robin's death to allow him to escape. The two then travel to Hong Kong to catch a 10-year-old assassin known as the Cricket, but are easily defeated. Just as Cassandra and Tim fall into unconsciousness, the Cricket vows to face them again someday, and tells them that he hopes they will put up a better fight next time.

The New 52
In what might be a variant timeline, Cassandra is a member of Barbara Gordon's League of Batgirls, operating on the field under her leadership alongside fellow Batgirls Stephanie Brown and Tiffany Fox. Her father, David Cain, is portrayed as a character named the "Orphan", who raises Cassandra alone and forces her not to speak but to "listen" to body movements and react accordingly with deadly precision. She was intended to be a "gift" to the villain "Mother", to show her that child assassins can be manipulated through "the old ways" instead of through the use of drugs, but "Mother" rejected her and told Orphan never to do anything behind her back again. Although she is used by Mother to kill Miranda Row, mother of Batman's new ally Harper Row, at the conclusion of the storyline, Harper forgives Cassandra for her role in her mother's death, while Cassandra's own father David sacrifices himself to kill Mother by trapping her in her disintegrating fortress, refusing to allow her to torture others in the future. At the storyline's conclusion, Cassandra adopts her father's identity of Orphan to continue protecting others.

DC Rebirth

As Orphan, Cassandra is later inducted into Batman and Batwoman's "boot camp" for young Gotham vigilantes. Orphan is known for being the best fighter on the team. She tries to fight the team's battles alone and is known for sneaking into Stephanie Brown's and Harper Row's apartments in the middle of the night. When Batman is attacked by the Colony, she tries to take them on by herself and is left injured and later sedated after leading the Colony into their base. Clayface helps Batwoman, Red Robin, Spoiler, and the injured Orphan escape.

Batman and the Outsiders
Cassandra was a part of the latest Outsiders team, alongside Batman, Black Lightning, Katana, and Signal.

Batman: The Joker War Zone
In this anthology comic, Cassandra and Stephanie Brown fight the Hench Master in Bludhaven. At the end of the story, both she and Stephanie reclaim the Bat symbol and Cass's costume becomes very similar to her previous Batgirl costume. In Infinite Frontier #0, Barbara Gordon – now primarily operating as Oracle again – explains to Huntress that Stephanie and Cass share the Batgirl title, but that she reserves the right to occasionally suit up as Batgirl in future.

Abilities

Skills and training
Like the rest of the Batman family, Cassandra has no superhuman powers. As a child, she received intensive training by her father, along with several other members of the League of Assassins, including Bronze Tiger, Merlyn the archer, and a series of instructors hired by her father, including Alpha. Upon taking the mantle of Batgirl, she was trained further by Batman, Oracle, Black Canary, and by Lady Shiva. She received supplementary instruction from Onyx. She is an amazing hand-to-hand combatant and is highly skilled in several martial arts, including Kung Fu, Jeet Kune Do, Muay Thai, and Ninjutsu. She was also very briefly trained in detective methods by Tim Drake during their time in Blüdhaven.

Cassandra's superiority in combat results not just from her excellent physical condition, but from her cognitive functions (the result of her idiosyncratic upbringing) that enables extraordinary feats of coordination as well as perceiving minute changes in an opponent's movements and body language. In Batgirl #14 (May 2001), the writer, Kelley Puckett, places Cassandra in a position within the story in which her skills are analyzed by a group of government experts. The creative team reveals to the reader that the character has no metagene. Yet her genetic status was felt to be incompatible with her recorded abilities. One expert states, "Her individual moves are borderline human. It's her aggregate speed that's metahuman. Look—humans can throw a 100 miles-per-hour fastball, smash concrete blocks with their heads, and run 4.2 forties. What they can't do is all of that at once. It's not so much physical as... as mentally impossible. Too much to coordinate."

Her upbringing using body language as her exclusive mode of communication also had the effect of enabling her to "read" minute changes in an opponent's expressions, breathing, muscles, joint position, and center of gravity which in turn allows her to see or "predict" an opponent's moves before they happen. It is possible this ability is only partially the result of her upbringing and that there is a genetic predisposition to it, since Lady Shiva, Cassandra's mother, is the only other martial artist known in the DC universe to have this ability. When a telepath "rewired" Cassandra's brain to allow her speech, this had the unintended consequence of blocking her ability to "predict" attacks, as though her ability to comprehend physical language was traded for her ability to speak and read. Eventually, Lady Shiva helped her to regain this ability, but how this was done is never revealed.

Cassandra also exhibits extraordinary resistance to pain. On more than one occasion, she has been described as "being able to take a bullet wound and not even bat an eye," due to additional training received as a child.

Language skills
As a side effect of her father's training, Cassandra's brain developed learning functions different from most. Having been brought up by Cain deliberately without speech, the communication centers of her brain learned body language instead of spoken or written language. Thus, she originally had as much trouble learning spoken and written language as a normal individual would have in learning body language. Although she was able to learn some very basic things ("no", "yes", "me") the same way a normal person can learn to recognize smiles and frowns, it took a telepath "rewiring" her brain to teach her to speak and understand English. Even then, she only spoke with extreme difficulty (very falteringly, short sentences with long pauses, frequently using the wrong words, etc.). In Batgirl #67 (October 2005), Oracle performed a number of tests on Cassandra, determining the severity of the problem: "The language centers of your brain are all over both hemispheres. Not centralized like with most people. When you try to read or write, your brain doesn't know how to keep it cohesive."

In the 2008 Batgirl miniseries, the first issue delves into an explanation as to Cassandra's increased verbal and literary skills. It is explained that during the year in which Batman, Nightwing, and Robin were abroad, Cassandra and Alfred took it upon themselves to help develop the skills that she lacked due to her less than conventional childhood. By day, she took speech and ESL courses. The formal training aided her thought processes related to language and thus her verbalization improved rapidly.

Costume and equipment
Cassandra's costume as Batgirl is composed of black skin-tight leather. Her mask covers all of her head with the exception of the eyes, which are darkened, and symbolic stitches surround the mouth of the mask. Cassandra wears a yellow-rimmed black logo rather than the yellow bat version of the logo worn by Barbara. The costume was first created and worn by the Huntress in the early stages of "No Man's Land".

Like the other members of the Bat-Clan, Cassandra's Batgirl also wears a yellow-pouched utility belt which contains grappling hooks, batarangs, mini-explosives, tracking devices, a hand-held computer, binoculars, PlastiCuffs, and smoke pellets. However, Cassandra rarely uses any of these devices.

The costume displays slight variations in Titans East. The cape shows a yellow lining and Cassandra wears a "capsule" utility belt rather than pouches. In Teen Titans vol. 3 #43, the once hollow bat-symbol appears to have been filled in and her cape is once again completely black; a new line of stitching goes up the forehead of her cowl. This version of the costume apparently results from one artist's interpretation, as Cassandra's appearances elsewhere (i.e., Supergirl and Batman and the Outsiders) show her wearing her standard Batgirl costume.

Her costume as Black Bat incorporates her former Batgirl costume, with some modifications. She now wears a domino mask and exposes the rest of her face and head. Her cape is now severely torn, looking ragged and almost smoke-like. Her hands are wrapped in bandages rather than her former scalloped bat-gloves.

The costume she currently wears as Orphan consists of a form-fitting longsleeved black top, gloves, and full head mask; occasionally she has worn a variant with an attached hood and no mask. Her pants are looser and baggier in the thighs to allow greater flexibility with her acrobatics, and she wears knee-high black boots. The entire costume has yellow accents, with small armor plates in strategic areas on the torso and arms, and includes a yellow utility belt.

Controversy
Critical reception of Cassandra's villainous turn in the "One Year Later" storyline was mixed. In general, the portrayal of Tim Drake was praised, whereas Cassandra's depiction was not. Upon being asked if Cassandra's characterization was editorially mandated, writer Adam Beechen stated, "When I came to the book, I was told that the first arc would deal with presenting Cassandra as a major new enemy for Robin. From there, I worked out the details of just how that would come about with our initial editor, Eddie Berganza, and then his successor, Peter Tomasi." In a follow-up interview, he clarified further, stating, "They didn't present me with a rationale as to why Cassandra was going to change, or a motivating factor. That was left for me to come up with and them to approve. And we did that. But as far as to why the editors and writers and whoever else made the decision decided that was a good direction, I honestly couldn't answer."

In interviews and press conferences, Dan DiDio and others have stated that Cass will "be going back to basics", as in her early adventures before she was able to talk. Later, Geoff Johns was quoted as saying, "We will be addressing in Teen Titans exactly what the deal is with her. Is she a bad guy? How? Why? She was a completely different character before 'One Year Later,' so let's find out what happened."

According to Wizard Magazine #182, the storyline was "one of the most controversial changes to come out of DC's 'One Year Later' event", and "fans rose up in arms, organizing websites and letter-writing campaigns to protest the change." Dan Didio commented, "I'm glad to see there was a reaction created, it shows that people care about the character and want to see something happen with her."

Other versions
 In the alternate timeline portrayed in the "Titans Tomorrow" storyline in Teen Titans, Cassandra was mentioned as having been murdered by Duela Dent. Years later, Tim Drake (now the new Batman) killed Duela in retaliation.
 In the timeline depicted in the sequel, Titans Tomorrow... Today!, Cassandra is portrayed as the successor to the Batwoman mantle, and a member of Lex Luthor's Titans Army. 
 A toddler version of Cassandra appears in several issues of Tiny Titans. She is a friend of Barbara Gordon and Stephanie Brown.
 In The New 52: Futures End, Cassandra appears as a member of the League of Batgirls alongside Stephanie Brown and a young African-American girl named Tiffany Fox (the daughter of Lucius Fox). Her friendship with Stephanie appears to have remained intact.
 In the DC Comics Bombshells universe, Cassandra is a Chinese heroine known as Black Bat. After the end of World War II, she returns to her home country to help rebuild and make life better for the young girls there.

Collected editions
Most of the 2000 Batgirl ongoing series, as well as the 2008 miniseries, has been collected into trade paperbacks.

Other collected editions
 Bruce Wayne: Murderer? (Batgirl #24)
 Bruce Wayne: Fugitive vol. 1 (Batgirl #27, #29)
 Bruce Wayne: Fugitive vol. 3 (Batgirl #33)
 Batman: War Games, Act 1 (Batgirl #55)
 Batman: War Games, Act 2 (Batgirl #56)
 Batman: War Games, Act 3 (Batgirl #57)
 Ghost/Batgirl: The Resurrection Machine (a 4-part miniseries crossover with Ghost, a Dark Horse Comics character)
 Bruce Wayne: Murderer? (New Edition) (Batgirl #24, #27)
 Bruce Wayne: Fugitive (New Edition) (Batgirl #29, #33)
 Batman: War Games Vol. 1 (Modern Release) (Batgirl #53, #55)
 Batman: War Games Vol. 2 (Modern Release) (Batgirl #56, #57)

In other media

Television
 Cassandra Wu-San / Orphan appears in Young Justice. This version is a member of Batman Incorporated, later the Team, who had her vocal cords removed by her mother, Lady Shiva, as an infant and was originally with the League of Shadows before Batgirl convinced her to defect, though Cassandra inadvertently paralyzed her in the process.
 Cassandra Cain / Batgirl appears in Batwheels, voiced by Leah Lewis. This version is cheerful, lighthearted, and able to communicate.

Film
 Cassandra Cain appears in Birds of Prey, portrayed by Ella Jay Basco. This version is a twelve-year-old pickpocket who lives with neglectful foster parents and idolizes Harley Quinn. After unknowingly pilfering a diamond that Roman Sionis sought after, Cain joins forces with Quinn, Dinah Lance, Renee Montoya, and Helena Bertinelli to defeat Sionis and his forces. Afterwards, Cain gives the diamond to the group before becoming Quinn's apprentice.
 An alternate universe incarnation of Cassandra Cain named Kai Li Cain will appear in Batman: The Doom That Came to Gotham, voiced by Tati Gabrielle.

Video games
 Cassandra Cain / Batgirl appears in Batman: Toxic Chill.
 Cassandra Cain / Batgirl makes a cameo appearance in Batman: Dark Tomorrow.
 Cassandra Cain / Batgirl appears in Batman: Justice Unbalanced.
 Cassandra Cain appears in Lego Batman: The Videogame.
 Cassandra Cain / Batgirl appears in DC Universe Online, voiced by Mindy Raymond.
 Cassandra Cain / Batgirl appears as a playable character in the mobile version of Injustice: Gods Among Us.
 Cassandra Cain appears in Lego DC Super-Villains.

Miscellaneous
 Cassandra Cain / Batgirl appears in the audiobook adaptation of Batman: No Man's Land, voiced by Nanette Savard.
 Cassandra Cain / Batgirl makes a cameo appearance in Batman: The Brave and the Bold #13.

References

External links

Cassandra Cain at DC Comics' official website
Interview with Kelley Puckett

Fictional characters from Chicago

Asian-American superheroes
Batgirl
Batman characters
Characters created by Jordan B. Gorfinkel
Characters created by Kelley Puckett
Characters created by Damion Scott
Comics characters introduced in 1999
DC Comics female superheroes
DC Comics female supervillains
DC Comics American superheroes
DC Comics sidekicks
DC Comics martial artists
Fictional acrobats
Fictional assassins in comics
Fictional blade and dart throwers
Fictional Jeet Kune Do practitioners
Fictional matricides
Fictional Muay Thai practitioners
Fictional Ninjutsu practitioners
Fictional patricides
Fictional female assassins
Fictional female ninja
Fictional mute characters
Superheroes who are adopted